Kościuszko Mound is an artificial mound in Kraków, Poland. It was erected by Cracovians in commemoration of the Polish national leader Tadeusz Kościuszko, and modelled after Kraków's prehistoric mounds of Krak and Wanda.

History

It was completed in November 1823. The location selected for the monument was the natural Blessed Bronisława Hill, also known as Sikornik, situated in the western part of Kraków's Zwierzyniec District.

Kościuszko Mound is one of Kraków's four memorial mounds, consisting of two prehistoric mounds, Krakus Mound and Wanda Mound, and two modern ones, Piłsudski Mound and Kościuszko Mound.

The founding ceremony of the Kościuszko Mound took place on 16 October 1820. The construction was financed by donations from Poles living in all territories of Poland under foreign occupation. Work was supervised by a Committee for the Construction of the Tadeusz Kościuszko Monument. At the base of the mound, the Founding Act was deposited in a glass and marble case. At the top, a granite boulder, brought from the Tatra Mountains, was placed, bearing the inscription "Kościuszce" (To Kościuszko). Inside the mound, urns were buried with soil from the Polish and American battlefields where Kościuszko fought. In 1860, on the 30th anniversary of the Polish November Uprising, the top of the mound was crowned with a boulder (545 kg) of granite from Tatra mountains which had engraved upon it: TO KOŚCIUSZKO.

Initially, the grounds around Kościuszko Mound were planned to be turned into a colony settlement for the peasant families that fought alongside Tadeusz Kościuszko in the uprising of 1794. In the late 1830s, those families began to settle at the foothills of Kościuszko Mound, but the process came to a halt when Austrian authorities decided to turn this area into a part of city's fortification.

Between 1850 and 1854, the Austrian authorities built a brick citadel around the mound and began using it as a strategic lookout. As compensation for an earlier historical church that had been demolished, a neo-Gothic chapel of Blessed Bronisława was also built. However, the Austrian fortifications, including the gateway and the southwestern rampart and entrenchment were eventually dismantled following World War II, between 1945 and 1956.

Next to the mound there is a museum devoted to Kościuszko, that displays artefacts and mementoes of his life and achievements. In 1997, heavy rains eroded the mound, thus threatening its existence. It went through a restoration process from 1999 till 2003 in which state-of-the-art technology and modern materials were used. The mound was equipped with a drainage system and a new waterproofing membrane.

Kościuszko Mound inspired Count Paul Strzelecki, Polish patriot and Australian explorer, to name the highest mountain in Australia Mount Kosciuszko, because of its perceived resemblance to the Kościuszko Mound in Kraków.

The mound in numbers
 Mound height: 35.54m 
 Mound height above sea level: 330.14m 
 Mound height above Vistula level: 131.14m 
 Mound diameter: 73.25m 
 Mound diameter with retaining wall (tamboure): 90.7m 
 Viewing platform diameter: 8.5m 
 Mound volume: approx. 167,000m³ 
 Slope angle: 46°-51°

Gallery

See also

 Tadeusz Kościuszko Monument, Kraków
 History of Kraków
 Culture of Kraków

Notes

References
 The mound of Tadeusz Kościuszko at the official website of the city of Kraków
 History of the Kościuszko Mound at Kościuszko Mound Homepage, Kraków
 Repairing of the Kościuszko Mound. An unconventional civil engineering project. Page archived by Internet Archive Wayback Machine
 Lives and Deeds of Foreign-born Heroes of the American Revolution, The United States Commission for the Preservation of America's Heritage Abroad, 107th Congress of the United States of America, 4 July 2002. Pg. 35. (PDF 2.5 MB)

Buildings and structures completed in 1823
Buildings and structures completed in 1854
Monuments and memorials in Kraków
Landmarks in Poland
Commemorative mounds
Artificial hills
1823 establishments in Poland